Medvezhya (Moyoro-dake) is a volcanic complex located at the northern end of Iturup Island, Kuril Islands, Russia. 
Rheniite, a rhenium sulfide mineral (ReS2), was discovered within the active hot fumaroles of the volcano in 1994

See also
Fumarole mineral
List of volcanoes in Russia

References

External links

Iturup
Active volcanoes
Volcanoes of the Kuril Islands
Calderas
VEI-7 volcanoes